Calvin John Oftana (born January 3, 1996) is a Filipino professional basketball player for the TNT Tropang Giga of the Philippine Basketball Association (PBA). He played college basketball for the San Beda Red Lions in the NCAA. He plays both the small forward and the power forward positions. He has also played as a shooting guard during college.

Early life 
Oftana was born in Danao, Cebu, but grew up in Siaton after his parents split up. He was raised by his mother along with his nine siblings. He did track and field, winning a 100-meter sprint in a district meet when he was Grade 6. He was also a volleyball spiker. When he got a growth spurt in high school, he was encouraged to try basketball. He played it in fiesta opens.

High school career 
When Oftana was in second year high school, he was discovered by Coach Mike Villahermosa of Asian College-Dumaguete. He convinced Oftana's mother to let Calvin play basketball for him. Under Coach Villahermosa, Oftana learned the basics of basketball. He also watched YouTube videos of shooting and dribbling drills to hone his skills further.

College career 
Oftana first played for the San Beda Red Lions in Season 92. He won titles with San Beda from 2016–2018. He was a backup to Art Dela Cruz and Javee Mocon during this time, as he developed his work ethic.

In Season 95, Oftana took on a bigger role. He had a near triple-double with ten points, ten rebounds, and seven assists in a win against the San Sebastian Stags. For that performance, he was given Player of the Week honors. He had a career-best of 27 points and nine rebounds against the CSB Blazers. He won Player of the Week again after scoring a personal-best 29 points while adding nine rebounds, five assists, and two steals in San Beda's rematch over the Blazers. He won MVP after averaging 15.6 points, 8.2 rebounds, 2.7 assists, and 1.2 blocks, becoming the eighth MVP to hail from San Beda (the first since Sudan Daniel in 2010), and finishing 18–0 in the eliminations as they gained an outright Finals berth. They lost to the Letran Knights in three games.

Professional career

NLEX Road Warriors (2021–2022)
In 2021, Oftana declared for the PBA Season 46 draft. He was offered to be included in the special Gilas round during the draft, but he declined. He was drafted with the third pick during the first round by the NLEX Road Warriors. In their elimination round match against the Meralco Bolts, he had 34 points on 8-of-11 shooting on three-pointers and 12-of-18 from the field in 29 minutes of play; breaking the all-time record in three point attempts made by a rookie at eighth, erasing the 34-year mark of Allan Caidic at seven. He scored the game-winning layup with 6.1 seconds left as NLEX got an 81–80 win in the quarterfinals. On February 11, 2022, during a 100–110 loss against the Meralco Bolts, Oftana exited the game in the fourth quarter after suffering an injury. It was later revealed to be a fractured left ring finger, and was subsequently ruled out for six weeks. Despite not being able to finish the season, he still made it to the PBA All-Rookie team.

In Oftana's first game since the injury (which was also NLEX's season-opener for the 2022 season), he scored 18 of his 20 points in the fourth quarter to help his team outscore the Terrafirma Dyip and complete their comeback win. Against the Phoenix Super LPG Fuel Masters, he made a three-pointer that sent the game into overtime. The Road Warriors won in overtime, and he finished with 22 points, 10 rebounds, seven assists, two steals, and two blocks. He then had 18 points against the NorthPort Batang Pier as NLEX claimed the 6th seed. In Game 3 of their Philippine Cup playoff series against the Magnolia Hotshots, he had 32 points, 9 rebounds, 3 assists, and 3 steals, but he wasn't able to score in overtime and Magnolia went on to eliminate them.

TNT Tropang Giga (2022–present)
On September 19, 2022, Oftana was traded to the TNT Tropang Giga in a three-team trade involving TNT, NLEX, and Blackwater Bossing. Prior to playing a game with the team, he signed a three-year contract extension on October 4.

PBA career statistics

As of the end of 2021 season

Season-by-season averages

|-
| align=left | 
| align=left | NLEX
| 19 || 22.9 || .456 || .319 || .744 || 5.9 || 1.7 || .6 || .6 || 10.4
|-class=sortbottom
| align="center" colspan=2 | Career
| 19 || 22.9 || .456 || .319 || .744 || 5.9 || 1.7 || .6 || .6 || 10.4

National team career 
In 2020, Oftana was called up to the national team to play against Thailand. In that contest, he scored 9 points on 3-of-5 shooting along with 4 rebounds and 4 assists.

In 2022, Oftana made his return to the national team for the fourth window of qualifying for the 2023 World Cup. He played against Lebanon and Saudi Arabia.

Notes

References

External links 
 PBA.ph profile

1996 births
Living people
Basketball players from Cebu
Filipino men's basketball players
NLEX Road Warriors draft picks
NLEX Road Warriors players
Philippine Basketball Association All-Stars
Philippines men's national basketball team players
Power forwards (basketball)
San Beda Red Lions basketball players
Small forwards
TNT Tropang Giga players